Beilschmiedia laotica is an Asian tree species in the family Lauraceae.  Records of occurrence are from Indo-China and in Vietnam it may be called két Lào; no subspecies are listed in the Catalogue of Life.

References 

Flora of Indo-China
Trees of Vietnam
laotica